Discophora deo, the banded duffer, is a butterfly found in Asia that belongs to the Morphinae subfamily of the brush-footed butterflies family.

Distribution
The banded duffer ranges from Manipur in India across to the northern part of Myanmar, the Shan States, northern Thailand to northern Vietnam.

Status
In 1932, William Harry Evans reported that the butterfly was very rare in its South Asian range.

See also
List of butterflies of India
List of butterflies of India (Morphinae)
List of butterflies of India (Nymphalidae)

Cited references

References
 de Nicéville, Lionel (1898) Journal of the Bombay Natural History Society 12 (1): 137.
 

Amathusiini
Butterflies of Asia
Butterflies of Indochina